Dojran is a municipality in the southeastern part of North Macedonia. Star Dojran is the village where the municipal seat is found. Dojran Municipality is part of the Southeastern Statistical Region.

Geography
The municipality borders Bogdanci Municipality to the west, Valandovo Municipality to the north, and Greece to the east and south.

Demographics

According to the last national census from 2021 this municipality has 3,084 inhabitants. Ethnic groups in the municipality include:

References

External links
 Official website

 
Southeastern Statistical Region
Municipalities of North Macedonia